Tom Pook (1869 – 21 February 1948) was an English-born Wales international rugby forward who played rugby union for Newport and rugby league with Holbeck (in Holbeck, Leeds). Although short for a forward player at  five foot six, Pook was described as possessing clever play and was good in the scrummage.

Rugby career
Pook came to note as a rugby player as part of first class Welsh team, Newport. Pook was part of the Newport team who during 1891/92 completed the season as 'invincibles' having not lost a single match. In 1895, Pook was selected to represent Wales in the country's second game of the 1895 Home Nations Championship, against Scotland. Under the captaincy of Wales rugby legend Arthur Gould, Pook was one of three Welsh players to make their début in the match. The other's being Pontypridd's Ernie George and Llanelli's Evan Lloyd. Wales initially threatened to pull out of the game, due to the team's belief that the Raeburn Place pitch was frozen, but agreed to compete when the playing field was shortneded by 20 yards to avoid a dangerous section of the field. Wales lost the game 5-4 and Pook did not represent Wales again.

In 1898 Pook turned professional by switching to rugby league team Holbeck, making his début on 3 September.

International matches played
Wales (rugby union)
 1895

External links
(archived by web.archive.org) Newport RFC player profile

Bibliography

References 

1869 births
1948 deaths
English people of Welsh descent
English rugby league players
English rugby union players
Holbeck F.C. players
Newport RFC players
Rugby league players from Devon
Rugby union players from Plymouth, Devon
Wales international rugby union players